Namna may refer to:
 Namnå, a village in Norway
 Namnaq, a village in East Azerbaijan Province, Iran
 Namna language, one of the Nambu languages of Papua New Guinea